Chulu may refer to:

Chulu Ranch, a tourist attraction ranch in Beinan Township, Taitung County, Taiwan
Chulu East and Chulu West, two of the trekking peaks in Nepal
Stepping Out (Singaporean TV series), a 1999 TV series

May also refer to, chihuahua: Bella Chulu